Brad Green (born 13 March 1981) is a former Australian rules football player and is the current North Melbourne development coach. He played for 13 seasons with the Melbourne Football Club in the Australian Football League (AFL). Drafted with the 19th selection in the 1999 AFL Draft, Green played in a losing Grand Final in his first season. In 2010 he won the club's best and fairest award and was the club's leading goalkicker, with many commentators stating he was unlucky to miss out on All-Australian selection. Green was named Melbourne's captain for the next season, but the appointment was short-lived as he held the position for only one year. He also represented the Australian International rules football team in 2004, 2010 and 2011, captaining the side in 2011.

Green was an assistant coach at North Melbourne, having previously been an assistant coach at the Carlton Football Club from 2013 to 2015.

He is currently a Director at the Melbourne Football Club

Early life
Green was born in Georgetown, Tasmania. A natural sportsman, Green played representative cricket and soccer as a teenager and captained the Australian under-15 cricket team.

Soccer career
While still a teenager, Green was selected for the senior soccer side at Launceston United SC in the Tasmanian soccer championship. Green attended the Launceston Church Grammar School in Tasmania, and later Victoria University and La Trobe University. During his early soccer-playing days as a teenager, he was scouted by Manchester United. After spending a month at on trial with the club, the 15-year-old Green trained with Walsall, a lower division English club, and was offered a contract but turned it down, choosing to finish his schooling in Tasmania. 

Green remains a soccer fan and supporter of Melbourne Victory.

Switch to Australian rules
Green only began playing Australian rules seriously in his mid-teens – after returning from England – but his talent was obvious. Green decided to focus his sporting attention on the local game playing for the Tassie Mariners and North Launceston. He was subsequently drafted to Melbourne in the 1999 AFL Draft.

AFL career
Green made his AFL debut in 2000. Melbourne had a highly successful year in 2000 and in his first year of AFL football Green played an important role in the Melbourne forward line. Melbourne made the Grand Final, but were ultimately unsuccessful, losing to Essendon.

After working his way into a greater role in the midfield in 2004, Green found plenty of the ball both forward and through the midfield in 2005. His penetrating and very accurate left foot kicking was effective to leading forwards or in front of goals. He often sets up Melbourne's marking forwards. He played in 21 of a possible 23 games in 2005, consolidating himself as an integral part of the Demons outfit in 2006 with consistent displays in the midfield and excelling as part of the leadership group. Green wore the number 18 guernsey for Melbourne.

Described, as a "soft" player early in his career, Green became renowned for his acts of courage mid-career, attacking the football with vigour and courage. This resulted in him taking a higher number of contested marks in 2007. In the 2007 season, he played very good football both in defence, the midfield, and in the forward line. Green continued his solid form into the 2008 season, being one of Melbourne's few highlights in a miserable season. It took time for Green to decide if he wanted to go on and play with the Demons in 2009 but eventually signed a contract and agreeing to stay red and blue for another three years.

In 2010, Green had his best season to date, kicking 55 goals and taking 153 marks, both ranked sixth in the AFL, in a young Melbourne side to make the All-Australian squad and win his first Keith 'Bluey' Truscott Medal. Green finished on 295 votes to win the award from James Frawley (277) and Mark Jamar (231). He also won the Ron Barrassi Leadership Award and the "Heart and Soul" Award, pushing his case to be the next captain of the Demons, after the retirement of James McDonald.

Green was named the new Melbourne captain in January 2011, succeeding James McDonald, who retired at the end of 2010. He described being named captain as a "surreal experience". He was also named captain of the Australia international rules football team for the 2011 Series in Australia, and was the only Australian to kick a goal during the 2011 International Rules Series; many commentators named this goal a "captain's goal".

Before the 2012 season, under new coach Mark Neeld, Green was removed from the captaincy and the leadership group altogether in favour of a new and younger group of whom only two were retained from the previous year.

Green played his 250th AFL game in Round 18 against North Melbourne, coincidentally the same team against whom he made his AFL debut back in 2000. On 8 August 2012, Green announced that he would retire at the conclusion of the 2012 season. He was the last remaining player from the club's 2000 Grand Final side to retire.

Statistics

|- style="background-color: #EAEAEA"
! scope="row" style="text-align:center" | 2000
|style="text-align:center;"|
| 18 || 20 || 28 || 9 || 104 || 32 || 136 || 50 || 18 || 1.4 || 0.5 || 5.2 || 1.6 || 6.8 || 2.5 || 0.9
|-
! scope="row" style="text-align:center" | 2001
|style="text-align:center;"|
| 18 || 21 || 37 || 15 || 103 || 52 || 155 || 53 || 25 || 1.8 || 0.7 || 4.9 || 2.5 || 7.4 || 2.5 || 1.2
|- style="background:#eaeaea;"
! scope="row" style="text-align:center" | 2002
|style="text-align:center;"|
| 18 || 21 || 29 || 23 || 164 || 66 || 230 || 85 || 27 || 1.4 || 1.1 || 7.8 || 3.1 || 11.0 || 4.0 || 1.3
|-
! scope="row" style="text-align:center" | 2003
|style="text-align:center;"|
| 18 || 21 || 35 || 19 || 201 || 102 || 303 || 93 || 46 || 1.7 || 0.9 || 9.6 || 4.9 || 14.4 || 4.4 || 2.2
|- style="background:#eaeaea;"
! scope="row" style="text-align:center" | 2004
|style="text-align:center;"|
| 18 || 21 || 26 || 10 || 270 || 151 || 421 || 106 || 41 || 1.2 || 0.5 || 12.9 || 7.2 || 20.0 || 5.0 || 2.0
|-
! scope="row" style="text-align:center" | 2005
|style="text-align:center;"|
| 18 || 21 || 28 || 14 || 224 || 145 || 369 || 127 || 54 || 1.3 || 0.7 || 10.7 || 6.9 || 17.6 || 6.0 || 2.6
|- style="background:#eaeaea;"
! scope="row" style="text-align:center" | 2006
|style="text-align:center;"|
| 18 || 23 || 11 || 17 || 308 || 191 || 499 || 159 || 60 || 0.5 || 0.7 || 13.4 || 8.3 || 21.7 || 6.9 || 2.6
|-
! scope="row" style="text-align:center" | 2007
|style="text-align:center;"|
| 18 || 18 || 13 || 8 || 220 || 164 || 384 || 117 || 49 || 0.7 || 0.4 || 12.2 || 9.1 || 21.3 || 6.5 || 2.7
|-style="background:#eaeaea;"
! scope="row" style="text-align:center" | 2008
|style="text-align:center;"|
| 18 || 20 || 20 || 13 || 271 || 186 || 457 || 140 || 60 || 1.0 || 0.7 || 13.6 || 9.3 || 22.9 || 7.0 || 3.0
|-
! scope="row" style="text-align:center" | 2009
|style="text-align:center;"|
| 18 || 12 || 12 || 3 || 152 || 109 || 261 || 73 || 20 || 1.0 || 0.3 || 12.7 || 9.1 || 21.8 || 6.1 || 1.7
|-style="background:#eaeaea;"
! scope="row" style="text-align:center" | 2010
|style="text-align:center;"|
| 18 || 22 || 55 || 27 || 295 || 129 || 424 || 153 || 58 || 2.5 || 1.2 || 13.4 || 5.9 || 19.3 || 7.0 || 2.6
|-
! scope="row" style="text-align:center" | 2011
|style="text-align:center;"|
| 18 || 21 || 37 || 25 || 205 || 128 || 333 || 106 || 61 || 1.8 || 1.2 || 9.8 || 6.1 || 15.9 || 5.0 || 2.9
|-style="background:#eaeaea;"
! scope="row" style="text-align:center" | 2012
|style="text-align:center;"|
| 18 || 13 || 19 || 18 || 96 || 39 || 135 || 55 || 29 || 1.5 || 1.4 || 7.4 || 3.0 || 10.4 || 4.2 || 2.2
|- class="sortbottom"
! colspan=3| Career
! 254
! 350
! 201
! 2613
! 1494
! 4107
! 1317
! 548
! 1.4
! 0.8
! 10.3
! 5.9
! 16.2
! 5.2
! 2.2
|}

Honours and achievements

Individual
Keith 'Bluey' Truscott Medal: 2010
Melbourne F.C. Captain: 2011
Melbourne F.C. Leading Goalkicker: 2010 (55 Goals)
Australian Representative Honours in International Rules Football: 2004, 2010, 2011 (Captain)
AFL Rising Star Nominee: 2000 (Round 19)

Coaching career
On 5 November 2012, Carlton Football Club announced that Green had been appointed as a development coach under Mick Malthouse. After three years at Carlton, Green joined the North Melbourne Football Club as their defensive coach.

Personal life
Green is a supporter of A-League Men soccer club Melbourne Victory.

Green's wife, Anna, died on 27 May 2019. The couple have two sons.

References

External links

1981 births
Living people
Melbourne Football Club players
Australian rules footballers from Launceston, Tasmania
People educated at Launceston Church Grammar School
Keith 'Bluey' Truscott Trophy winners
Melbourne Football Club captains
Tassie Mariners players
Tasmanian Football Hall of Fame inductees
Casey Demons players
North Launceston Football Club players
Australia international rules football team players